Imparable is the O.G. Black's debut album.

Track listing 
 Menor De Edad
 Top Secret (Official Remix) (feat. Cosculluela, Opi "The Hit Machine", Guayo "El Bandido", Yomo & Yaviah)
 Curiosidad (feat. Trebol Clan)
 Mi Ex
 Caza Bichotes (feat. J-King & Maximan & Guayo "El Bandido")
 Pal Motel (feat. Guayo "El Bandido")
 Rankankan (feat. Julio Voltio, Ñengo Flow, Farruko, Yaga & Mackie, Baby Rasta, Guelo Star, O'Neill & Guayo "El Bandido")
 Prestame Tu Cuerpo (feat. Opi "The Hit Machine")
 Soltera Y Sin Compromiso (feat. Guayo "El Bandido")
 Despues De 2 Tragos (feat. D.OZi & Guayo "El Bandido")
 Hacertelo En Un Avion (feat. Kid & JQ)
 Mi Locura (feat. Noriega)
 Tengo Amor Para Dar (feat. Elias Diaz)
 Siento (feat. Kmero)
 Menor De Edad (Official Remix) (feat. Yaga & Mackie)

References

2013 albums